The New York county football team represents the New York metropolitan area in men's Gaelic football and is governed by New York GAA, the County Board of the Gaelic Athletic Association. The team competes in three of the four major annual inter-county competitions; the All-Ireland Senior Football Championship, Tailteann Cup and the Connacht Senior Football Championship; it does not currently compete in the National Football League.

New York's home ground is Gaelic Park, New York City. The team's manager is Johnny McGeeney.

New York last won the National League in 1967. New York has never won the Connacht Senior Championship or All-Ireland Senior Championship.

History
In 1981, in front of a sold-out crowd of 5,000, the New York Select Carroll's All Stars defeated Galway (after a draw the previous Sunday) at Gaelic Park NY,  This was the match at which Brian Quinn unfurled his "Carroll You're an Animal" banner.

Gerry Fox, the former Longford footballer, was appointed manager for the 2020 season. But the team withdrew due to the impact of the COVID-19 pandemic on Gaelic games.

Under Johnny McGeeney's management, New York played against an opponent from outside Connacht in 2022, a first in championship history, Offaly the opponent and Tullamore the venue.

Current squad

Managerial history

Justin O'Halloran ?–202?

Gerry Fox 2019–2?

Johnny McGeeney 2021–present

Competitive record

League
New York has three league titles.

1950: New York defeated Cavan in the final.

1964: Dublin made the trip to The Bronx for the final, also billed as the "World Championship". A Brendan O'Donnell goal after half-time allowed NY to build up a seven-point lead, which a Dublin rally reduced to one point. Late in the game, players brawled on the field and were joined by a spectator, who received a black eye. New York captain Tom Hennessy scored a late point to seal victory.

1967: Three-in-a-row All-Ireland SFC winner Galway was defeated in the final.

New York participated in the FBD League until 2011.

Championship

New York first competed in the Connacht Senior Football Championship in 1999 and first competed in the Tailteann Cup in its first edition, in 2022. They also competed in the newly revamped  All-Ireland Junior Football Championship in 2022, beating Warwickshire in the semi final but losing in the final to Kilkenny in their first ever Croke Park appearance.

Results

New York remains winless in the Connacht SFC, having lost four times each to Galway*, Roscommon+ and Leitrim and five to Mayo and Sligo.

|* = In 2020, Galway post-phoned New York due to COVID-19. Next meeting scheduled for 2025.

|+ = In 2021, Roscommon called off New York due to COVID-19. Next meeting scheduled for 2026.

In addition, in 2010, New York took part in the Connacht Minor Football Championship (MFC) for the first time. The team played Galway in its first game in that competition but sustained a heavy defeat. The New York minor football team travelled to Ireland to play in the Connacht MFC again the following year. History repeated itself, with another heavy loss to Roscommon.

Honours
National Football League
 Winners (3): 1949–50, 1963–64, 1966–67
All-Ireland Junior Football Championship
 Runners-up (1): 2022

References

 
County football teams